Lily of the Alley is a 1924 British silent film drama directed by Henry Edwards, who also starred in the film with his wife Chrissie White.  Lily of the Alley was filmed in 1922 and given trade showings in early 1923, but its general release to cinemas was delayed until February 1924 due to various problems within the British film industry at the time.

Background
Lily of the Alley was experimental in form, with Edwards attempting the innovation of producing a coherent screen narrative entirely without the use of intertitles.  The film is regarded as significant in cinema history as the earliest documented feature-length dramatic silent film to be made consisting solely of visual sequences without any titling to explain the action to audiences, pre-dating the next-known example (a 1923 German film called Schatten) by several months.  The film's release was greeted with great interest, but contemporary reviews seem to suggest the finished product to have been a praiseworthy attempt rather than an unqualified success, with the subject matter of the ups and downs of a husband/wife relationship lending itself less well to the absence of titles than a more visually driven action or comic storyline would have.  The Bioscope felt that Edwards' self-imposed restriction "leads to some rather far-fetched ways of conveying simple ideas", although The Times considered that the film was still "an intrinsically absorbing drama, coherently presented".

Plot
Only sketchy details of the film's plot appear to survive.  Bill (Edwards) and Lily (White) are newly married.  Bert works as a tea salesman and is of a naturally cheery disposition.  Over time however, worries about the security of his job and income prey on his mind and he frets over not being able to provide for Lily.  With his worries heightened by the fear that he is about to go blind, he falls into a deep depression and becomes a shadow of the happy soul he used to be.  Lily becomes desperately anxious about him, and one night has a terrible nightmare in which she dreams that he loses first his sight and then his life (either in a fire, or by being robbed and murdered, depending on the source).  However things eventually take a turn for the better and the couple welcome their new baby to the family.

Cast
 Henry Edwards as Bill
 Chrissie White as Lily
 Frank Stanmore as Alf
 Mary Brough as Widow
 Campbell Gullan as Sharkey
 Lionel d'Aragon as Dad

Preservation
As a product of Hepworth Picture Plays, it is thought most likely that prints of Lily of the Alley would have been seized, along with all other film material in the possession of Cecil Hepworth, by administrators called in to wind up the company's affairs when Hepworth was declared bankrupt later in 1924.  The film stock was then melted down to release its marketable silver nitrate content and it is presumed that most of the Hepworth company's full-length features of the 1910s and early 1920s were irretrievably lost at this time.  No print of Lily of the Alley is held in the British Film Institute's National Archive, although they do possess a number of screenshots from the film on file.  A modicum of hope remains that the film may one day surface unexpectedly (as was the case with Hepworth's 1920 feature Helen of Four Gates, rediscovered in a Canadian archive in 2008 after an absence of almost 90 years) and the film's official status is "missing, believed lost".  In view of its historical interest, Lily of the Alley is listed as one of the BFI's "75 Most Wanted" missing British feature films.

See also
List of lost films

References

External links
BFI 75 Most Wanted entry, with extensive notes

Progressive Silent Film List: Lily of the Alley at silentera.com

1924 films
1924 drama films
British drama films
British silent feature films
British black-and-white films
Films directed by Henry Edwards
Films set in London
Lost British films
Hepworth Pictures films
1924 lost films
Lost drama films
1920s British films
Silent drama films